The Ziama Massif is a forested mountain range in Nzérékoré Region of southeastern Guinea.

Geography
The Ziama Massif extends northeast-southwest, continuing south into Liberia as the Kpo Range. The eastern slopes are drained  by the St. Paul River, and the western slopes by the Lofa River; both rivers drain southwest through Liberia to empty into the Atlantic Ocean. The highest points of the massif reach to almost 1,400 meters above sea level. The forested landscape includes valleys, plateaus, rounded ridges, rocky peaks, sheer cliffs and granite outcrops.

Flora and fauna
The Ziama Massif is part of the Guinean montane forests ecoregion, and harbors a distinct flora and fauna from the surrounding lowlands.

Ziama Strict Nature Reserve
The Ziama Forest was designated a nature reserve in 1932 and approved as a Biosphere Reserve by UNESCO in 1980, covering 1,161.70 km². It is considered by conservationists as a relict of the diminishing Upper Guinean forest formation. The Ziama Massif Biosphere Reserve is home to more than 1,300 species of plants and more than 500 species of animals.

Gallery

See also 
Wildlife of Guinea
Forest Guinea

References

External links 
Ziama Massif Biosphere Reserve

Ziama Massif: a case study

Ziama Massif (Protected Planet)
Afromontane
Guinean montane forests
Protected areas of Guinea
Protected areas established in 1932
Mountain ranges of Guinea
Biosphere reserves of Guinea
Forests of Guinea